Glendale is a city in St. Louis County, Missouri, United States. The population was 5,925 at the 2010 census.

History
Glendale was voted the best place to live in Missouri in 2014 by movoto.com, and was named from the scenic dales or glens in the region.

Notable people

The following are people who have either resided in Glendale or regularly visited
 Gerty and Carl Ferdinand Cori, a couple who won the Nobel Prize in Physiology or Medicine in 1947

Geography
Glendale is located at  (38.593052, −90.384191).

Demographics

2020 census
As of 2020, there were 6,176 people living in the city.

2010 census
As of the census of 2010, there were 5,925 people, 2,273 households, and 1,686 families living in the city. The racial makeup of the city was 96.7% White, 0.7% African American, 0.9% Asian, 0.4% from other races, and 1.1% from two or more races. Hispanic or Latino of any race were 1.6% of the population.

There were 2,273 households, of which 38.6% had children under the age of 18 living with them, 65.2% were married couples living together, 7.4% had a female householder with no husband present, 1.6% had a male householder with no wife present, and 25.8% were non-families. 23.5% of all households were made up of individuals, and 10.2% had someone living alone who was 65 years of age or older. The average household size was 2.61 and the average family size was 3.11.

The median age in the city was 40.5 years. 29.2% of residents were under the age of 18; 4% were between the ages of 18 and 24; 23.7% were from 25 to 44; 29.3% were from 45 to 64; and 13.8% were 65 years of age or older. The gender makeup of the city was 46.2% male and 53.8% female.

2000 census
As of the census of 2000, there were 5,767 people, 2,294 households, and 1,640 families living in the city. The racial makeup of the city was 97.61% White, 0.88% African American, 0.03% Native American, 0.55% Asian, 0.31% from other races, and 0.61% from two or more races. Hispanic or Latino of any race were 1.13% of the population.

There were 2,294 households, out of which 35.7% had children under the age of 18 living with them, 62.6% were married couples living together, 7.4% had a female householder with no husband present, and 28.5% were non-families. 26.0% of all households were made up of individuals, and 11.6% had someone living alone who was 65 years of age or older. The average household size was 2.51 and the average family size was 3.06.

In the city the population was spread out, with 27.7% under the age of 18, 3.7% from 18 to 24, 28.3% from 25 to 44, 25.9% from 45 to 64, and 14.5% who were 65 years of age or older. The median age was 40 years. For every 100 females, there were 88.6 males. For every 100 females age 18 and over, there were 83.1 males.

The median income for a household in the city was $75,279, and the median income for a family was $90,250. Males had a median income of $70,018 versus $36,552 for females. The per capita income for the city was $35,136. About 0.4% of families and 0.4% of the population were below the poverty line, including 0.3% of those under age 18 and none of those age 65 or over.

References

External links
 City of Glendale official website

Cities in St. Louis County, Missouri
Cities in Missouri